Abdul-Rahman Othman  (born 10 February 1942) is a Sudanese politician. He is Minister of Oil and Gas.

Specialized certificates and positions 
 Graduate of Mechanical Engineering University of Khartoum 1967
 Bachelor of First Honors and PhD University of Birmingham – England 1974
 Professor of Mechanical Engineering, Faculty of Engineering, University of Khartoum and Coordinator of Agricultural Engineering Certificate
 Secretary of the College Council and Chairman of the Examinations Committee until September 1981
 Joined the Abu Dhabi National Oil Company (ADNOC) Al Ruwais Refinery as head of the engineering development department responsible for the design, procurement, contracts and implementation of more than four hundred small projects and twenty major projects within eight years, including expansion of the refinery from 120,000 to 220,000 barrels per day
 Participated in the development of labor systems, staffing limits and employment structures. He has vast experience in management, contracts, negotiations, security and safety

See also
Ministry of Oil and Gas (Sudan)

References

External links
Ministry of Oil & Gas (official website)

Living people
Government ministers of Sudan
1942 births
People from Khartoum